Cherrie's pocket gopher (Heterogeomys cherriei) is a species of rodent in the family Geomyidae. It is found in Honduras, Nicaragua, and Costa Rica. It is threatened by habitat loss. Some authors classify it in the genus Orthogeomys, but recent research has allowed this and its related species to be classified in the genus Heterogeomys.

Taxonomy 

Traditionally, the species is subdivided into three subspecies:

 Orthogeomys cherriei carlosensis (Goodwin, 1934)
 Orthogeomys cherriei cherriei (J. A. Allen, 1893)
 Orthogeomys cherriei costaricensis (Merriam, 1895)

Recent study has allowed the identification of a fourth subspecies, previously considered as a separate species:

 Heterogeomys cherriei matagalpae J. A. Allen, 1910, geographically isolated subspecies found in Honduras and Nicaragua.

References

Heterogeomys
Gopher, Cherrie's pocket
Mammals described in 1893
Taxonomy articles created by Polbot
Taxobox binomials not recognized by IUCN